The Revolutionary Social Democratic Party is a minor political party of the Dominican Republic. It is without parliamentary representation despite have gained 1.6 percent of the vote after counting of the 16 May 2006 election.

References

www.prsdweb.com: Official Website.

Political parties in the Dominican Republic
Social democratic parties in North America
Social democratic parties
Socialism in the Dominican Republic